Zao Wou-Ki (1 February 1920 – 9 April 2013) was a Chinese-French painter. He was a member of the Académie des Beaux-Arts in Paris. Zao Wou-Ki graduated from the China Academy of Art in Hangzhou, where he studied under Fang Ganmin and Wu Dayu.

Early years
Zao was born in Beijing with family roots in Dantu, Zhenjiang, Jiangsu province. In his childhood he was brought back to his hometown Dantu where he studied calligraphy and gained acceptance to the Hangzhou School of Fine Arts. From 1935 to 1941, he studied painting at the China Academy of Art in Hangzhou, Zhejiang province, where he was taught by Lin Fengmian, Fang Ganmin and Wu Dayu. In 1948, he went with his wife Xie Jinglan (謝景蘭), a composer, to Paris to live on the same block in Montparnasse where the classes of Émile Othon Friesz took place. His earliest exhibitions in France were met with praise from Joan Miró and Picasso.

Personal life 
Zao and his wife Lalan (Xie Jinglan) pursued their own careers, their son having stayed in China with Zao's parents. In the mid-1950s, they were divorced. In 1957, Zao decided to visit the United States where his younger brother Chao Wu-Wai was living in Montclair, New Jersey, close to the art scene of New York City. He wanted to learn more about "pop art". While in the US, he painted seven canvases at his brother's house. There are relatively few items dating from that year (1957). Years later, the largest canvas was given by his brother, Chao Wu-Wai, to the Detroit Institute of Arts.

He left the U.S. after a six-week stay, traveling to Tokyo and then to Hong Kong, where he met his second wife Chan May-Kan (陈美琴, May Zao), a film actress who had two children from her first marriage. Under the influence of Zao, she became a successful sculptor. In 1972, she committed suicide at age 41 due to mental illness. In 1972, he also visited his family in China who he had not seen since 1948.

In 1997, he married his third wife Françoise Marquet, who now serves as president of the Zao Wou-Ki Foundation.

Career
Zao's works, influenced by Paul Klee, are orientated to abstraction. He names them with the date in which he finishes them, and in them, masses of colours appear to materialise a creating world, like a Big Bang, where light structures the canvas. He worked formats in triptychs and diptychs. While his work was stylistically similar to the Abstract Expressionists whom he met while travelling in New York, he was influenced by Impressionism. Zao Wou-Ki stated that he had been influenced by the works of Matisse, Picasso and Cézanne.

His meetings with Henri Michaux pushed him to review his Indian ink techniques, always based in Chinese traditional drawings. Zao was a member of the Académie des beaux-arts, and was considered to have been one of the most successful Chinese painters during his lifetime.

In 1982, he was invited to paint for the Fragrant Hills Hotel in Beijing, designed by I. M. Pei. I. M. Pei had a fellowship to Europe in the early 1950s and he met Wou-Ki at Galerie Claude Bernard, the gallery that represented Wou-Ki. In 1983, he returned to his alma mater, the China Academy of Art in Hangzhou to give lectures.

Former French President Jacques Chirac was offered a painting by Zao Wou-Ki by his ministers during their last meeting.

By the end of his life Zao had stopped producing new paintings due to health problems. He died on 9 April 2013 at his home in Switzerland.

Art Auction Results 
Between 2009 and 2014, the value of his work tripled, leading to a scarcity of paintings and to prices rising even higher.

2017 

 Zao Wou-ki's 29.01.64 (1964) was sold for HK$202.6m (US$26m) at Christie's in Hong Kong, setting a new auction record for the artist and the world record for an oil painting by any Asian artist. The record for the artist was previously held by 29.09.64, another large painting that was sold for HK$153m (US$19.6m) at Christie's Hong Kong in May this year.

2018 

 Juin-Octobre 1985, the largest size that Zao Wou-ki ever worked on, was sold for HK$510m after premium, setting the record for the most valuable painting sold in Hong Kong auctions, as well as the auction record for an oil painting by an Asian artist.

References

External links 
 Zao Wou-Ki: Ink and Watercolor at de Sarthe Gallery, Hong Kong
 Zao Wou-Ki: Paintings 1950's - 1960's at de Sarthe Gallery, Hong Kong
 Zhao Wuji at Gallery Heede & Moestrup - Copenhagen
  赵无极：在巴黎重新发现中国

1920 births
2013 deaths
Burials at Montparnasse Cemetery
20th-century Chinese painters
21st-century Chinese painters
20th-century French painters
20th-century French printmakers
20th-century French male artists
21st-century French painters
20th-century French lithographers
21st-century French lithographers
20th-century French engravers
21st-century French engravers
21st-century French male artists
French stamp designers
French male painters
Art Informel and Tachisme painters
Members of the Académie des beaux-arts
School of Paris
Alumni of the Académie de la Grande Chaumière
Painters from Beijing
Chinese emigrants to France
China Academy of Art alumni
Grand Officiers of the Légion d'honneur
Recipients of the Praemium Imperiale
Republic of China painters